Mendatica ( or ) is a comune (municipality) in the Province of Imperia in the Italian region Liguria, located about  southwest of Genoa and about  northwest of Imperia.

Mendatica borders the following municipalities: Briga Alta, Cosio di Arroscia, Montegrosso Pian Latte, and Triora.

See also 
 Colle San Bernardo di Mendatica
 Parco naturale regionale delle Alpi Liguri

References

Cities and towns in Liguria